Lorado Zadok Taft (April 29, 1860 – October 30, 1936) was an American sculptor, writer and educator. His 1903 book, The History of American Sculpture, was the first survey of the subject and stood for decades as the standard reference. He has been credited with helping to advance the status of women as sculptors.

Taft was the father of U.S. Representative Emily Taft Douglas, father-in-law to her husband, U.S. Senator Paul Douglas, and a distant relative of U.S. President William Howard Taft.

Early years and education

Taft was born in Elmwood, Illinois. His parents were Don Carlos Taft and Mary Lucy Foster. His father was a professor of geology at the Illinois Industrial University (later renamed the University of Illinois at Urbana–Champaign). He lived much of his childhood at 601 E. John Street, Champaign, Illinois, near the center of the UIUC campus. The house, now known as the Taft House was built by his father in 1873. It was purchased by the university in 1949 and moved about one mile southeast. After being homeschooled by his parents, Taft earned his bachelor's degree (1879) and master's degree (1880) at Illinois Industrial University.

After his master's degree, he left for Paris to study sculpture, attending the École nationale supérieure des Beaux-Arts from 1880 to 1883, where he studied with Augustin Dumont, Jean-Marie Bonnassieux, and Gabriel Thomas. His record there was outstanding; he was cited as "top man" in his studio and twice exhibited at the Salon.

Career

Sculptor and educator
Upon returning to the United States in 1886, Taft settled in Chicago. He taught at The School of the Art Institute of Chicago until 1929. In addition to work in clay and plaster, Taft taught his students marble carving, and had them work on group projects. He also lectured at the University of Chicago and the University of Illinois.

In 1892, while the art community of Chicago was preparing for the World's Columbian Exposition of 1893, chief architect Daniel Burnham expressed concern to Taft that the sculptural adornments to the buildings might not be finished on time. Taft asked if he could employ some of his female students as assistants (it was not socially accepted for women to work as sculptors at that time) for the Horticultural Building. Burnham responded, "Hire anyone, even white rabbits, if they'll do the work." From that arose a group of talented women sculptors known as "the White Rabbits", which included Enid Yandell, Carol Brooks MacNeil, Bessie Potter Vonnoh, Janet Scudder, Julia Bracken, and Ellen Rankin Copp.

Later, another former student, Frances Loring, noted that Taft used his students' talents to further his own career, a not-uncommon situation. In general, history has given Taft credit for helping to advance the status of women as sculptors.

At a meeting in St. Paul, Minnesota to decide which artist submission to select for a monument of Col. William Colvill to go in the Minnesota State Capitol rotunda, the state art commission asked the opinion of Taft who was in the city at the time. While he did not recommend any of the models, he thought the model by Catherine Backus had points in its favor.  Originally the commission favored the model by John K. Daniels but it was voted down. They then selected Backus' model to execute in a nine foot full-size bronze.

Lectures and writings
As Taft grew older, his eloquence and compelling writing led him, along with Frederick Ruckstull, to the forefront of sculpture's conservative ranks, where he often served as a spokesperson against the modern and abstract trends that developed during his lifetime. Taft's frequent lecture tours for the Chautauqua gave him a broad, popular celebrity status.

In some settings, Taft is better known for his writings than for his sculpture. In 1903, Taft published The History of American Sculpture, the first survey of the subject. The revised 1925 version was to remain the standard reference on the subject until the art historian E. Wayne Craven published Sculpture in America in 1968. In 1921, Taft published Modern Tendencies in Sculpture, a compilation of his lectures given at the Art Institute of Chicago. At the time, it offered a distinct perspective on the development of European sculpture; today, the book continues to be regarded as an excellent survey of American sculpture in the early years of the 20th century.

Associations
In 1898, Taft was a founding member of the Eagle's Nest Art Colony, which is currently a field and research campus for Northern Illinois University in Oregon, Illinois.  Taft designed the Columbus Fountain at Union Station in Washington, D.C., in collaboration with Daniel Burnham. Taft was a member of the National Academy of Design, the National Institute of Arts and Letters, and the American Academy of Arts and Letters; he headed the National Sculpture Society in the 1920s, exhibiting at both their 1923 and 1929 shows, and he served on the Board of Art Advisors of Illinois. He served on the U.S. Commission of Fine Arts from 1925 to 1929, and was an honorary member of the American Institute of Architects.  His papers reside in collections at the Smithsonian Archives of American Art, the University of Illinois, and the Art Institute of Chicago.

He maintained his connections with his alma mater throughout his life. (His association with the University is commemorated by a street named in his honor.) In 1929, he dedicated his sculpture Alma Mater on the University of Illinois campus. Two figures behind her on either side represent the university's motto, Learning and Labor.

Final years
He received numerous awards, prizes, and honorary degrees.

Taft was active until the end of his life. The week before he died, he attended the Quincy, Illinois, dedication ceremonies for his sculpture celebrating the Lincoln–Douglas debates. He died in his home studio in Chicago on October 30, 1936. He was cremated, and his ashes were scattered at Elmwood Cemetery near Bloomington, Illinois.

Sculptor's body of work
Taft may be best remembered for his various fountains.

The University of Illinois Archives has a series of photographs of most of Taft's important works, including many of their construction and preliminary models.

Following more than a dozen years of work, Taft's Fountain of Time was unveiled at the west end of Chicago's Midway Plaisance in 1922. Based on poet Austin Dobson's lines—"Time goes, you say? Ah no, Alas, time stays, we go." The fountain shows a cloaked figure of time observing the stream of humanity flowing past.

The last major commission that Taft completed was two groups for the front entrance to the Louisiana State Capitol Building, dedicated in 1932.

He left unfinished a vast work to be called the Fountain of Creation which he planned to place at the opposite end of the Chicago Midway to the Fountain of Time.  Parts of this work were donated to the University of Illinois at Urbana–Champaign and are now at the library and Foellinger Auditorium.  The University named a dormitory and a street in Taft's honor.

In 1965, his Chicago workplace at 6016 Ingleside Avenue (he moved there in 1906, when the building consisted merely of a brick barn) was designated a National Historic Landmark as Lorado Taft Midway Studios.

Selected commissions

 LaFayette Fountain, Lafayette, Indiana, 1887
 Schuyler Colfax, University Park, Indianapolis, Indiana, 1887
 Statue of George Washington, University of Washington, Seattle, Washington, 1905–1909. Created for the 1909 Alaska–Yukon–Pacific Exposition.
 Eternal Silence, Graves Memorial, Graceland Cemetery, Chicago, Illinois, 1909
 Chief Paduke Statue, Jefferson Street, Paducah, Kentucky, 1909
 Black Hawk Statue Monument, aka Eternal Indian, Oregon, Illinois,  1911
 The Solitude of the Soul, Art Institute of Chicago, Chicago, Illinois, 1911–1914
 Columbus Fountain, in front of Union Station, Washington, D.C., 1912.
 Fountain of the Great Lakes, Art Institute of Chicago, Chicago, Illinois, 1913
 Seated Woman With Children aka Music, Chicago, Illinois,  1915
 Thatcher Memorial Fountain, Denver, Colorado, 1918
 Two Boys with Dolphins Fountain, Oregon, Illinois, ca. 1920
 Fountain of Time, Chicago, Illinois, 1922
 William A. Foote Memorial, Woodland Cemetery, Jackson, Michigan, 1923
 Lincoln the Lawyer, Urbana, Illinois, 1927
 Annie Louise Keller Memorial, White Hall, Illinois, 1929
 Alma Mater, University of Illinois, 1929
 Frances Elizabeth Willard (plaque), Indiana Statehouse, Indianapolis, Indiana, 1929
 The Crusader, Lawson Monument, Graceland Cemetery, Chicago, Illinois, 1931
 Two Groups: The Pioneers and The Patriots, Louisiana State Capitol, Baton Rouge, Louisiana, 1932
 Ontario Sends Greetings to the Sea, eleventh issue of the Society of Medalists, 1935
 Bas-relief of Lincoln – Douglas Debate, Quincy, October 13, 1858, Quincy, Illinois, 1936
 Heald Square Monument (Robert Morris – George Washington – Haym Salomon), Chicago, Illinois, 1936–1941. Completed by Leonard Crunelle, Nellie Walker and Fred Torrey following Taft's 1936 death.
 Trotter Fountain, Bloomington, Illinois, 1911

War memorials
 4th Michigan Infantry Monument, Gettysburg Battlefield, Gettysburg, Pennsylvania, 1889
 General Ulysses S. Grant Monument, Fort Leavenworth, Kansas, 1889
 Student Veteran Memorial, Hillsdale College, Hillsdale, Michigan, 1895
 Defense of the Flag, Withington Park, Jackson, Michigan, 1904
 The Soldiers' Monument, Oregon, Illinois, 1916

Students and assistants
During his long career, Taft acted as a mentor and teacher for many sculptors, including:

 Enrique Alférez
 Jean Pond Miner Coburn
 Alice Cooper
 Leonard Crunelle
 Ulric Ellerhusen
 Paul Fjelde
 Sherry Edmundson Fry
 Waylande Gregory
 Carl Augustus Heber
 Frederick Hibbard
 Mary Lawrence
 Evelyn Beatrice Longman
 Frances Loring
 Carol Brooks MacNeil
 Helen Farnsworth Mears
 Charles Mulligan
 William Clark Noble
 C. Adrian Pillars
 Trygve Rovelstad
 Belle Kinney Scholz
 Janet Scudder
 Clara Sorensen
 John Storrs
 Charles Umlauf
 Bessie Potter Vonnoh
 Nellie Walker
 Julia Bracken Wendt
 Florence Wyle
 Enid Yandell

Notes

Additional sources
 
 
 
 
 
 
 
 
 
 
 
 
 
 

 

External links

 
 
 Lorado Taft Papers, 1857-1953 University of Illinois Archives
The Ryerson & Burnham Libraries: Archives Collection: Lorado Taft Collection, 1908–1938
 Descriptions and photographs of two works Defense of the Flag memorial and William A Foote memorial
 American Art American City: Lorado Taft, Artbeat Chicago segment on WTTW's Chicago Tonight'', May 15, 2008

19th-century American sculptors
19th-century male artists
American male sculptors
20th-century American sculptors
20th-century male artists
1860 births
1936 deaths
Taft family
People from Elmwood, Illinois
Illinois Industrial University alumni
American alumni of the École des Beaux-Arts
National Sculpture Society members
People from Oregon, Illinois
Members of the American Academy of Arts and Letters